The 1955–56 Sussex County Football League season was the 31st in the history of the competition.

Division 1 still remained at seventeen teams with Three Bridges United being promoted from Division 2. Division 2 now featured fourteen teams from which the winners would be promoted into Division 1.

Division One
The division featured 17 clubs, 16 which competed in the last season, along with one new club:
Three Bridges United, promoted from last season's Division Two

League table

Division Two
The division featured 14 clubs, 10 which competed in the last season, along with four new clubs:
Crawley, relegated from last season's Division One
Battle Rangers
Hailsham
Uckfield Town

League table

References

1955-56
9